Kekertukdjuak Island formerly Kekertuk Island is an uninhabited island in the Qikiqtaaluk Region of Nunavut, Canada. It is located where Kingnait Fiord joins the Cumberland Sound, off Baffin Island's Cumberland Peninsula. The Kikastan Islands (Akulagok Island, Kekerten Island, Tuapait Island) lie to its southwest. Beacon Island, Miliakdjuin Island, Tesseralik Island, and Ugpitimik Island are in the vicinity.

References

Islands of Baffin Island
Islands of Cumberland Sound
Uninhabited islands of Qikiqtaaluk Region